"When You've Been Blessed (Feels Like Heaven)" is a song by American singer Patti LaBelle. It was written by LaBelle,  Nona Hendryx, Nathanial Wilkie, and James "Budd" Ellison for her 1991 album Burnin', while production was overseen by the latter. The song was released as the third single off the album in the spring of 1992.

Critical reception
Ron Wynn from AllMusic said the song "had decent production touches and frenetic vocals" in his review of Burnin'.<ref>{{cite web|first= Ron |last= Wynn |title= Patti LaBelle – Burnin''' |publisher= AllMusic |accessdate= November 4, 2020 |url= https://www.allmusic.com/album/burnin-mw0000269444}}</ref> Cashbox wrote, "This single is a slow-paced track that has a real smooth sound to it. For the majority of the song, LaBelle holds back on those glass-shattering vocals that she's well known for. As a follow-up to her number one hit single, "Somebody Loves You", this one seems destined to follow along that same path. Beautiful song."

Credits and personnel
Credits adapted from the liner notes of Gems''.

Patti LaBelle – vocals, writer
Nona Hendryx – writer
James R. "Budd" Ellison – producer, writer
Nathanial Wilkie – associate producer, writer

Charts

Weekly charts

Year-end charts

References

1991 songs
1992 singles
Patti LaBelle songs
MCA Records singles
Gospel songs
Soul ballads
1990s ballads
Songs written by Patti LaBelle